Senglea Athletic Football Club is a professional Maltese football club based in Senglea. Founded in 1943, the club currently plays in the Maltese National Amateur League.

History 

Senglea Athletic Football Club was founded in 1943. It took over from the former Senglea United club, which had been formed in 1921 following the demise of Senglea Shamrocks. After the Second World War the club began to compete in the Second Division (today's Third Division) organised by the Malta Football Association.

Apart from moments of success and happiness, this club also had his disappointing moments. For many times this club had to play in the lowest divisions of Malta.

The most moments of glory and happiness occurred in the mid-70's when the club was promoted to the second division, and later on to the first division. For a number of successive times Senglea Athletic F.C. were declared champions of the second division.

For another time, in 1981, the club was promoted to the Maltese Premier Division. During that season, Senglea Athletic made history when they contested in the final of the MFA Trophy, while being in the Maltese First Division. The club was very near to participate in the European Cup Winners' Cup, but unfortunately the final against Floriana F.C. ended in a 2–1 loss for Senglea Athletic F.C. During that time the president for the club was Walter Clinch.

From that time onwards Senglea Athletic F.C. passed through some very bad moments due to financial crisis. But then in the year 2000, they got back to their feet and were promoted from the Maltese Third Division to the Maltese Second Division, together with Msida F.C. During that time the president for Senglea Athletic F.C. was Reno Chirchop.

The next year, Senglea Athletic F.C., this time again with Msida F.C., were promoted to the Maltese First Division. During that time the president for Senglea Athletic F.C. was Dr. Vincent S. Zammit. The club's aim of competing in the Maltese Premier League took a step backwards, when during the 2008–09 season they were relegated to the Maltese Second Division. During the season 2009–10 Senglea Athletic finished in the 9th place, just a position above the relegation play-offs.

Kit
The home kit of Senglea Athletic F.C. consists of the primary colours of Senglea, yellow and red. The manufacturer of the kits is Givova, while the main sponsor is Palumbo Shipyards.

Current squad

Senior Squad
Note: The same squad number may be used by more than one player. If that is the case, the last player who have used the number is assigned with it.

During the 2007/08 season Senglea were crowned champions of Section D of the MFA Youth League, and thus they were promoted to Section C.

The following season also proved to be a successful one for the Senglea boys. Apart from finishing 4th in Section C, taking into consideration that this was their first season in this level, they also managed to reach the semi-final of the Youth Knock-Out B, where clubs from Sections B, C and D take part. In the semi-final they lost 5–1 to the Section B club, Qormi.

During the season 2011/12 Senglea were crowned champions of Section C, and therefore gaining promotion to Section B. They also managed to reach the semi-final of the knock-out once again. They were eliminated by the designated champions Balzan Youths.

Statistics

Honours

Club
 Maltese First Division (Level 2)
Champions : 1974/75, 1980/81
 Maltese Second Division (Level 3)
 Runners-Up : 2001/02
 Maltese Third Division (Level 4)
 Champions : 2012/13
 F.A. Trophy
 Runners-Up : 1980/81
 Youths / Minors (Under-19)
 Section C
 Champions : 1960/61, 1967/68, 2011/12
 Section D
 Champions : 2007/08
 Youth Knock-Out
 Semi-Final : 2008/09, 2009/10
 Youth Knock-Out B
 Semi-Final : 2011/12

Individual
 Maltese First Division (Level 2)
 Best Player
 Winner : George Attard (2005/06)
 Runner-Up : Elvin Attard (2002/03)
 Nominee : Anthony Ewurum (2007/08) 
 Top-Scorer
 Runner-Up : Anthony Ewurum (2007/08)
 Maltese Third Division (Level 4)
 Best Player
 Winner : Gatt Victor (2000/01)
 Top-Scorer
 Winner : Gatt Victor (2000/01)

Gallery

Footnotes

References 

 
Association football clubs established in 1943
Football clubs in Malta
1943 establishments in Malta